Chief James Ajibola Idowu Ige  (13 September 1930 – 23 December 2001), simply known as Bola Ige, was a Nigerian lawyer and politician. He served as Federal Minister of Justice of Nigeria from January 2000 till his assassination in December 2001. He previously served as governor of Oyo State from 1979 to 1983 during the Nigerian Second Republic.

Background
James Ajibola Idowu Adegoke Ige was born in Esa Oke, Osun State in the South Western part of Nigeria on 13 September 1930.
His parents were Yoruba natives of Esa-Oke town, in the old Oyo State (now in Osun State).
Ige left Kaduna and headed south to the Western region at the age of 14.
He studied at Ibadan Grammar School (1943–48), and then at the University of Ibadan. From there, he went to the University College London, where he graduated with a law degree in 1959. He was called to the bar in London's Inner Temple in 1961.

Ige established Bola Ige & Co in 1961, and later became a Senior Advocate of Nigeria.
He became well known in the country for his oratory prowess, as well as his advocacy work on civil rights and democracy. Ige's faith was Christianity. Uncommonly, Ige spoke all the three major Nigerian languages, Yoruba, Ibo and Hausa fluently. He wrote several books, and an anthology of articles and tributes about him was published shortly after his death.

Early political career
During the First Republic (1963–66), at the age of 31 he was at the centre of the Action Group crisis, when Chief Obafemi Awolowo was pitted against his deputy, Chief Samuel Ladoke Akintola.
He became a rival of Olusola Olaosebikan for succession to Obafemi Awolowo. Ige was a Commissioner for Agriculture in the now-defunct Western Region of Nigeria (1967–70) under the military government of General Yakubu Gowon.
In 1967, he became a friend of Olusegun Obasanjo, who was a commander of the army brigade in Ibadan.

In the early 1970s, during the first period of military rule, he devoted his time to the anti-racism campaign of the World Council of Churches.

Towards the end of the 1970s he joined the Unity Party of Nigeria (UPN), the successor to the Action Group.
When General Olusegun Obasanjo initiated the Second Republic, he was elected as governor of Oyo State from October 1979 to October 1983.
Adebisi Akande, later to be governor of Osun State after it was split off from Oyo State, was his deputy governor during this period.
In the 1983 elections, when he ran for re-election as the UPN candidate, he was defeated by Dr. Victor Omololu Olunloyo. Ige unsuccessfully challenged the election in court. However, Olunloyo lost the seat three months later to a coup staged by Generals Muhammadu Buhari and Tunde Idiagbon.

Ige was detained after the coup, accused of enriching himself with  party funds. He was released in 1985, after the next coup, by Ibrahim Babangida, and returned to his legal practice and to writing. In 1990, he published People, Politics And Politicians of Nigeria: 1940–1979, a book that he had begun while imprisoned.
He was one of the founders of the influential Yoruba pressure group, Afenifere. Although critical of the military rule of General Sani Abacha, Ige avoided political difficulties during this period.

Fourth Republic
Following the restoration of democracy in 1999, Ige sought the nomination of the Alliance for Democracy party as a presidential candidate, but was rejected.
President Obasanjo appointed Ige as minister of Mines and Power (1999–2000).
He was not able to make significant improvements to service provided by the monopolistic National Electric Power Authority (NEPA).

He then became Minister of Justice and Attorney General of the Federal Republic of Nigeria (2000–2001).
In September 2001, Ige said that the Federal government had initiated a program to re-arrange and consolidate the laws of the Federation, publish them in digital form, and make them available on the website of his ministry.
He campaigned ardently against the imposition of the Sharia law in the northern states of Nigeria.
In November 2001, he said that the Federal government would not allow the Sokoto State government to execute the judgement of a verdict passed by a Gwadabawa sharia court to stone a woman, Safiya Hussaini to death for committing adultery.

Ige was about to take up a new position as a member of the United Nations International Law Commission when he was gunned down in Ibadan, the Oyo State capital.

Death
On 23 December 2001, Ige was shot dead at his home in the south-western city of Ibadan. He had been entangled in squabbles within his Alliance for Democracy party in Osun State. The previous week, the long-running feud between Osun state Governor Bisi Akande and his deputy, Iyiola Omisore, had apparently contributed to the death of an Osun State legislator, Odunayo Olagbaju.
The government of President Olusegun Obasanjo deployed troops in south-western Nigeria to try to prevent a violent reaction to the murder.
Although various people were arrested and tried for involvement in the murder, including Iyiola Omisore, all were acquitted.
As of November 2010 the killers had not been found. He was buried in his home town in Esa-Oke, Osun State.
In a speech at his funeral, he was quoted as saying that he was sure that Nigeria was worth living for but he was not so sure that it was worth dying for.

Books
 Golden Quotes: a selection of my favourite inspirational quotations. Ibadan : Pocket Gifts ; Oxford : African Books Collective [distributor], c2000. x, 163 pp.; 19 cm. 
 Detainee's Diary Ibadan : NPS Educational, 1992. 262 p. ; 23 cm. 
 
 Constitutions and the problem of Nigeria Lagos: Nigerian Institute of Advanced Legal Studies, 1995. 36 pp.; 21 cm.

See also

List of unsolved murders

References

External links
 Banjo, Ayo (ed.), Bola Ige: Passage of a Modern Cicero. An anthology of views, reviews and tributes, dedicated to the Nigerian politician assassinated in 2001. B/w illus, 215pp, NIGERIA. BOOKCRAFT LTD, 2003. Paperback
 Ladigbolu, A. G. A., Prince. The success of Bola Ige administration in the old Oyo State of Nigeria. [Nigeria]: Lichfield Printing Co., [2003] vii, 160 pp.: ill. ; 22 cm. 

1930 births
People from Osun
2001 murders in Nigeria
2001 deaths
20th-century Nigerian politicians
20th-century Nigerian lawyers
Action Group (Nigeria) politicians
Alliance for Democracy (Nigeria) politicians
Alumni of University College London
Assassinated Nigerian politicians
Attorneys General of Nigeria
Burials in Oyo State
Deaths by firearm in Nigeria
Federal ministers of Nigeria
Governors of Oyo State
Ibadan Grammar School alumni
International Law Commission officials
Justice ministers of Nigeria
Lawyers from Ibadan
Nigerian Christians
Nigerian officials of the United Nations
People from Zaria
People murdered in Ibadan
Senior Advocates of Nigeria
Unity Party of Nigeria politicians
Unsolved murders in Nigeria
Yoruba legal professionals
Yoruba politicians